"We Takin' Over" is the first single from DJ Khaled's second album, We the Best. Akon, T.I., Rick Ross, Fat Joe, Birdman and Lil Wayne are all featured on this hip hop track. Nate "Danja" Hills assisted the artists in writing the song and is also the producer. 

The song was released through the iTunes Store on March 27, 2007. The song debuted at number 51 on the US Hot R&B/Hip-Hop Songs chart and has since peaked at number 26 on the chart. It debuted on the US Billboard Hot 100 on the issue date of April 14, 2007, at number 75, and has since peaked at number 28 on the chart.

Music video
Cameos in the video are made by Pitbull, Bun B, Junior Reid, DJ Infamous, Freeway, Triple C's, Dolla, Johnny Dang, T-Pain, Trina, Curren$y, and Cool & Dre among others. The video was inspired by The Notorious B.I.G.'s video for "Hypnotize". The video was styled by Armend Cobi and directed by Gil Green.

Critical reception
VIBE selected Lil Wayne's guest appearance in "We Takin' Over" to be his best of 2007, ranking the song at No. 1 on their list of the 77 best Lil Wayne songs and appearances.

Remix

"We Takin'  Over" (Official Remix) (featuring R. Kelly, Akon, T-Pain, Lil' Kim and Young Jeezy)

Lil' Wayne recorded a remix/freestyle of 'We Takin' Over', known to some as 'My Daddy' for his mixtape, Da Drought 3.
Nicki Minaj also recorded a remix/freestyle of 'We Takin' Over', titled 'Playtime Is Over' for her mixtape, Playtime Is Over. Female rappers Trina, Remy Ma and Jacki-O, and singers Lil' Mo, and DJ Lazy K recorded a remix for Remy Ma's mixtape, Shesus Khryst, which was also featured on Trina's mixtape, Rockstarr Royalty, albeit slightly edited. Flo Rida also has a remix called the "Poe Boy Remix" from his Mr. Birthday Man mixtape. It features Brisco, Triple C's, and Ashley Ross.
The song was also re-released in 2011 as a single by singer Akon, who was also featured on the original release in 2007.

Charts

Weekly charts

Year-end charts

Certifications

References

2007 singles
2007 songs
DJ Khaled songs
Akon songs
T.I. songs
Rick Ross songs
Fat Joe songs
Birdman (rapper) songs
Lil Wayne songs
Song recordings produced by Danja (record producer)
Songs written by DJ Khaled
Songs written by T.I.
Songs written by Rick Ross
Songs written by Fat Joe
Songs written by Akon
Songs written by Lil Wayne
Songs written by Danja (record producer)
Music videos directed by Gil Green